The dwarf Mexican tree frog (Tlalocohyla smithii) is a species of frog in the family Hylidae endemic to Mexico.

Habitat and distribution
Its natural habitats are subtropical or tropical dry forests, intermittent rivers, and intermittent freshwater marshes.

It ranges from central Sinaloa southwards along the Pacific lowlands to southern Oaxaca, and inland in the Balsas-Tepalcatepec Basin Guerrero, Morelos, and Puebla states. It is found at elevations from sea level to 1,332 meters.

Conservation
It is threatened by habitat loss.The frog's distribution is caused by abiotic and biotic factors as well as, the availability of resources and characteristics of reproductive sites.

References

Luna-Gómez, M. I., García, A., & Santos-Barrera, G. (2017). Spatial and temporal distribution and microhabitat use of aquatic breeding amphibians (Anura) in a seasonally dry tropical forest in Chamela, Mexico. Revista De Biología Tropical, 65(3), 1082. https://doi.org/10.15517/rbt.v65i3.29440 

Tlalocohyla
Endemic amphibians of Mexico
Frogs of North America
Amphibians described in 1901
Taxa named by George Albert Boulenger
Taxonomy articles created by Polbot
Sinaloan dry forests
Balsas dry forests